Roger Karrer is a Swiss professional ice hockey defenceman who is currently playing with Genève-Servette HC of the National League (NL). He previously played for the GCK Lions and the ZSC Lions.

Playing career
Karrer made his professional debut with the GCK Lions of the Swiss League (SL) in the 2014-15 season, appearing in 43 SL games this season. He also made his National League (NL) debut that same year with the ZSC Lions, playing 5 games and scoring no point. Karrer also played the 2015 playoffs with Zurich's junior team in the Elite Junior A, scoring 3 points in 12 games and helped the team win the championship.

Karrer eventually played 121 NL games (13 points) with Zurich and 91 SL games (23 points) with their affiliate before signing a three-year contract with an option for a fourth season with Genève-Servette HC on November 21, 2018. The contract runs from the 2019/20 season through the 2021/22 season. On May 13, 2021, Karrer renegotiated his contract to sign a new 4-year deal with Servette through the 2024/25 season.

International play
Karrer made his debut with Switzerland men's team in 2018.

References

External links

1997 births
Living people
GCK Lions players
Genève-Servette HC players
Swiss ice hockey defencemen
ZSC Lions players
Ice hockey people from Zürich